The San Justo was a 70-gun - from 1790, 74-gun - ship of the line built at the royal shipyard in Cartagena, Spain and launched in 1779.

She fought at the Battle of Cape Spartel in 1782 and the Battle of Trafalgar in 1805. In the latter battle, under the command of Capitán de Navío Miguel María Gastón de Iriarte, she was placed in the Centre Division, but managed to avoid being heavily engaged throughout the battle and had few casualties - none killed and just seven injured.

References and notes

Ships of the line of the Spanish Navy
1779 ships
Ships built in Spain
Maritime incidents in 1805